A. A. Ewing was an American football player and coach.  He served as the second head football coach at Northwestern University, coaching one season in 1894 and compiling a record of 4–5.  Ewing attended classes at the University of Chicago in 1894 while he was coach at Northwestern and also played for the Chicago Maroons football team that season.

Head coaching record

References

Year of birth missing
Year of death missing
19th-century players of American football
American football quarterbacks
Chicago Maroons football players
Northwestern Wildcats football coaches